Ben Agbee is an artist of Ghana. He was born in Ghana in 1966, and majored in art at college. He graduated in 1989. After graduation, Agbee continued to paint while he worked in advertising and design.

Working mostly in acrylic on canvas, Agbee focuses almost exclusively on the subject of African women, usually in profile, often drawing on two different motifs for their depiction. Some works, such as Wait A Minute, show them talking in groups, and are characterized by intricate detail of symbols embedded in their clothing or the canvas background. Others, such as Migration, feature the dark, clean profiles of these women on backgrounds of colorful, geometric shapes, somewhat evocative of sand dunes.

Agbee has participated in several collective and individual exhibitions in Accra, other locations in Ghana, the Netherlands, the United States, New Zealand and other locations internationally. Along with Ethiopian modern artist Wosene Worke Kosrof, he is one of the few artists to have his work featured annually in the Contemporary African Art calendar published by Avalanche Publishing.

References

External links
Gallery of selected Ben Agbee artwork

1966 births
Living people
20th-century Ghanaian painters
20th-century Ghanaian male artists
Male painters
21st-century Ghanaian male artists